Rogue Agent may refer to:

 Rogue Agent (film), a 2022 British film
 GoldenEye: Rogue Agent a 2004 first-person shooter game